The London Inter-Bank Offered Rate (Libor) is an interest rate average calculated from estimates submitted by the leading banks in London. Each bank estimates what it would be charged were it to borrow from other banks. It is the primary benchmark, along with the Euribor, for short-term interest rates around the world. Libor was phased out at the end of 2021, and market participants are being encouraged to transition to risk-free interest rates.

As of late 2022, parts of it have been discontinued, and the rest is scheduled to end within 2023; the Secured Overnight Financing Rate (SOFR) is its replacement. 

Libor rates are calculated for five currencies and seven borrowing periods ranging from overnight to one year and are published each business day by Thomson Reuters. Many financial institutions, mortgage lenders, and credit card agencies set their own rates relative to it. At least $350 trillion in derivatives and other financial products are tied to Libor.

In June 2012, multiple criminal settlements by Barclays Bank revealed significant fraud and collusion by member banks connected to the rate submissions, leading to the Libor scandal. The British Bankers' Association said on 25 September 2012 that it would transfer oversight of Libor to UK regulators, as proposed by Financial Services Authority managing director Martin Wheatley's independent review recommendations. Wheatley's review recommended that banks submitting rates to Libor must base them on actual inter-bank deposit market transactions and keep records of those transactions, that individual banks' Libor submissions be published after three months, and recommended criminal sanctions specifically for manipulation of benchmark interest rates. Financial institution customers may experience higher and more volatile borrowing and hedging costs after implementation of the recommended reforms. The UK government agreed to accept all of the Wheatley Review's recommendations and press for legislation implementing them.

Significant reforms, in line with the Wheatley Review, came into effect in 2013 and a new administrator took over in early 2014. The British government regulates Libor through criminal and regulatory laws passed by Parliament. In particular, the Financial Services Act 2012 brings Libor under UK regulatory oversight and creates a criminal offence for knowingly or deliberately making false or misleading statements relating to benchmark-setting.

Introduction
The London Interbank Offered Rate (LIBOR) came into widespread use in the 1970s as a reference interest rate for transactions in offshore Eurodollar markets.
In 1984, it became apparent that an increasing number of banks were trading actively in a variety of relatively new market instruments, notably interest rate swaps, foreign currency options and forward rate agreements. While recognizing that such instruments brought more business and greater depth to the London Inter-bank market, bankers worried that future growth could be inhibited unless a measure of uniformity was introduced. In October 1984, the British Bankers' Association (BBA)—working with other parties, such as the Bank of England—established various working parties, which eventually culminated in the production of the BBA standard for interest rate swaps, or "BBAIRS" terms. Part of this standard included the fixing of BBA interest-settlement rates, the predecessor of BBA Libor. From 2 September 1985, the BBAIRS terms became standard market practice. BBA Libor fixings did not commence officially before 1 January 1986. Before that date, however, some rates were fixed for a trial period commencing in December 1984.

Member banks are international in scope, with more than sixty nations represented among its 223 members and 37 associated professional firms as of 2008. Seventeen banks for example currently contribute to the fixing of US Dollar Libor. The panel contains the following member banks:

 Bank of America
 Bank of Tokyo-Mitsubishi UFJ
 Barclays Bank
 Citibank NA
 Credit Agricole CIB
 Credit Suisse
 Deutsche Bank
 HSBC
 JP Morgan Chase
 Lloyds Banking Group
 Rabobank
 Royal Bank of Canada
 Société Générale
 Sumitomo Mitsui Banking Corporation Europe Ltd
 Norinchukin Bank
 Royal Bank of Scotland
 UBS AG

Scope
Libor is  widely used as a reference rate for many financial instruments in both financial markets and commercial fields. There are three major classifications of interest rate fixings instruments, including standard inter bank products, commercial field products, and hybrid products that often use Libor as their reference rate.

Standard interbank products:
Forward rate agreements
Interest rate futures, e.g. Eurodollar futures
Interest rate swaps
Swaptions
Overnight indexed swaps, e.g. Libor–OIS spread
Interest rate options, Interest rate cap and floor

Commercial field products:
Floating rate notes
Floating rate certificates of deposit
Syndicated loans
Variable rate mortgages
Term loans

Hybrid products:
Range accrual notes
Step up callable notes
Target redemption notes
Hybrid perpetual notes
Collateralized mortgage obligations
Collateralized debt obligations

In the United States in 2008, around sixty percent of prime adjustable-rate mortgages and nearly all subprime mortgages were indexed to the US dollar Libor. In 2012, around 45 percent of prime adjustable rate mortgages and more than 80 percent of subprime mortgages were indexed to the Libor. American municipalities also borrowed around 75 percent of their money through financial products that were linked to the Libor. In the UK, the three-month British pound Libor is used for some mortgages—especially for those with adverse credit history. The Swiss franc Libor is also used by the Swiss National Bank as their reference rate for monetary policy.

The usual reference rate for euro denominated interest rate products, however, is the Euribor compiled by the European Banking Federation from a larger bank panel. A euro Libor does exist, but mainly, for continuity purposes in swap contracts dating back to pre-EMU times. The Libor is an estimate and is not intended in the binding contracts of a company. It is, however, specifically mentioned as a reference rate in the market standard International Swaps and Derivatives Association documentation, which are used by parties wishing to transact in over-the-counter interest rate derivatives.

Definition
Libor is defined as:

This definition is amplified as follows:
 The rate that each bank submits must be formed from that bank's perception of its cost of funds in the inter-bank market.
 Contributions must represent rates formed in London and not elsewhere.
 Contributions must be for the currency concerned, not the cost of producing one currency by borrowing in another currency and accessing the required currency via the foreign exchange markets.
 The rates must be submitted by members of staff at a bank with primary responsibility for management of a bank's cash, rather than a bank's derivative book.
 The definition of "funds" is: unsecured inter-bank cash or cash raised through primary issuance of inter-bank certificates of deposit.

The British Bankers' Association published a basic guide to the BBA Libor, which contains a great deal of detail as to its history and its current calculation.

Technical features

Calculation
Libor is calculated by the Intercontinental Exchange (ICE) and published by Refinitiv. It is an index that measures the cost of funds to large global banks operating in London financial markets or with London-based counterparties. Each day, the BBA surveys a panel of banks (18 major global banks for the USD Libor), asking the question, "At what rate could you borrow funds, were you to do so by asking for and then accepting interbank offers in a reasonable market size just prior to 11 am?" The BBA throws out the highest four and lowest four responses, and averages the remaining middle ten, yielding a 22% trimmed mean. The average is reported at 11:30 am.

Libor is actually a set of indexes. There are separate Libor rates reported for seven different maturities (length of time to repay a debt) for each of five currencies. The shortest maturity is overnight, the longest is one year. In the United States, many private contracts reference the three-month dollar Libor, which is the index resulting from asking the panel what rate they would pay to borrow dollars for three months.

Currency
In 1986, the Libor initially fixed rates for three currencies. These were the US dollar, British pound sterling and the Deutsche Mark. Over time this grew to sixteen currencies. After a number of these currencies in 2000 merged into the euro, there remained ten currencies. Following reforms of 2013 Libor rates are calculated for five currencies.

Active until June 2023
US dollar (USD)

Inactive from December 2021
Euro (EUR)
British pound sterling (GBP)
Japanese yen (JPY)
Swiss franc (CHF)

Inactive from 2013
Australian dollar (AUD)
Canadian dollar (CAD)
New Zealand dollar (NZD)
Danish krone (DKK)
Swedish krona (SEK)

Note that the Euro LIBOR should not be confused with EURIBOR.

Maturities
Until 1998, the shortest duration rate was one month, after which the rate for one week was added. In 2001, rates for a day and two weeks were introduced Following reforms of 2013 Libor rates are calculated for 7 maturities.

Active until June 2023
1 day
1 month
3 months
6 months
12 months

Inactive from December 2021
1 week
2 months

Inactive from 2013
2 weeks
4 months
5 months
7 months
8 months
9 months
10 months
11 months

Libor-based derivatives

Libor futures
GBP and CHF LIBOR futures are traded on Intercontinental Exchange (ICE) and on CurveGlobal, part of the London Stock Exchange Group. USD LIBOR futures (aka Eurodollar futures) are traded on the Chicago Mercantile Exchange. JPY LIBOR futures (aka Euroyen futures) are traded on the Tokyo Financial Exchange and the Chicago Mercantile Exchange.

Interest rate swaps
Interest rate swaps based on short Libor rates currently trade on the interbank market for maturities up to 50 years. In the swap market a "five-year Libor" rate refers to the five-year swap rate where the floating leg of the swap references three- or six-month Libor (this can be expressed more precisely as for example "5-year rate vs 6-month Libor"). "Libor +  basis points", when talking about a bond, means that the bond's cash flows have to be discounted on the swaps' zero-coupon yield curve shifted by  basis points to equal the bond's actual market price. The day count convention for Libor rates in interest rate swaps is Actual/360, except for the GBP currency for which it is Actual/365 (fixed).

Reliability and scandal

On Thursday, 29 May 2008, The Wall Street Journal (WSJ) released a controversial study suggesting that banks might have understated borrowing costs they reported for Libor during the 2008 credit crunch. Such under-reporting could have created an impression that banks could borrow from other banks more cheaply than they could in reality. It could also have made the banking system or specific contributing bank appear healthier than it was during the 2008 credit crunch. For example, the study found that rates at which one major bank (Citigroup) "said it could borrow dollars for three months were about 0.87 percentage point lower than the rate calculated using default-insurance data."

In September 2008, a former member of the Bank of England's Monetary Policy Committee, Willem Buiter, described Libor as "the rate at which banks don't lend to each other", and called for its replacement. The former Governor of the Bank of England, Mervyn King, later used the same description before the Treasury Select Committee.

To further bring this case to light, The Wall Street Journal reported in March 2011 that regulators were focusing on Bank of America Corp., Citigroup Inc. and UBS AG. Making a case would be very difficult because determining the Libor rate does not occur on an open exchange. According to people familiar with the situation, subpoenas were issued to the three banks.

In response to the study released by the WSJ, the British Bankers' Association announced that Libor continues to be reliable even in times of financial crisis. According to the British Bankers' Association, other proxies for financial health, such as the default-credit-insurance market, are not necessarily more sound than Libor at times of financial crisis, though they are more widely used in Latin America, especially the Ecuadorian and Bolivian markets.

Additionally, some other authorities contradicted the Wall Street Journal article. In its March 2008 Quarterly Review, The Bank for International Settlements has stated that "available data do not support the hypothesis that contributor banks manipulated their quotes to profit from positions based on fixings."
Further, in October 2008 the International Monetary Fund published its regular Global Financial Stability Review, which also found that "Although the integrity of the U.S. dollar Libor-fixing process has been questioned by some market participants and the financial press, it appears that U.S. dollar Libor remains an accurate measure of a typical creditworthy bank's marginal cost of unsecured U.S. dollar term funding."

On 27 July 2012, the Financial Times published an article by a former trader that stated Libor manipulation had been common since at least 1991. Further reports on this have since come from the BBC and Reuters. On 28 November 2012, the Finance Committee of the Bundestag held a hearing to learn more about the issue.

In late September 2012, Barclays was fined £290m because of its attempts to manipulate the Libor, and other banks are under investigation of having acted similarly.  Wheatley called for the
British Bankers' Association to lose its power to determine Libor and for the FSA to be able to impose criminal sanctions as well as other changes in a ten-point overhaul plan.

The British Bankers' Association said on 25 September that it would transfer oversight of LIBOR to UK regulators, as proposed by Financial Services Authority managing director Martin Wheatley and CEO-designate of the new Financial Conduct Authority.

On 28 September, Wheatley's independent review was published, recommending that an independent organisation with government and regulator representation, called the Tender Committee, manage the process of setting LIBOR under a new external oversight process for transparency and accountability. Banks that make submissions to LIBOR would be required to base them on actual inter-bank deposit market transactions and keep records of their transactions supporting those submissions. The review also recommended that individual banks' LIBOR submissions be published, but only after three months, to reduce the risk that they would be used as a measure of the submitting banks' creditworthiness. The review left open the possibility that regulators might compel additional banks to participate in submissions if an insufficient number do voluntarily. The review recommended criminal sanctions specifically for manipulation of benchmark interest rates such as the LIBOR, saying that existing criminal regulations for manipulation of financial instruments were inadequate. LIBOR rates may be higher and more volatile after implementation of these reforms, so financial institution customers may experience higher and more volatile borrowing and hedging costs. The UK government agreed to accept all of the Wheatley Review's recommendations and press for legislation implementing them.

Bloomberg LP CEO Dan Doctoroff told the European Parliament that Bloomberg LP could develop an alternative index called the Bloomberg Interbank Offered Rate that would use data from transactions such as market-based quotes for credit default swap transactions and corporate bonds.

Criminal investigations
On 28 February 2012, it was revealed that the US Department of Justice was conducting a criminal investigation into Libor abuse. Among the abuses being investigated were the possibility that traders were in direct communication with bankers before the rates were set, thus allowing them an advantage in predicting that day's fixing. Libor underpins approximately $350 trillion in derivatives. One trader's messages indicated that for each basis point (0.01%) that Libor was moved, those involved could net "about a couple of million dollars".

On 27 June 2012, Barclays Bank was fined $200m by the Commodity Futures Trading Commission, $160m by the United States Department of Justice and £59.5m by the Financial Services Authority for attempted manipulation of the Libor and Euribor rates. The United States Department of Justice and Barclays officially agreed that "the manipulation of the submissions affected the fixed rates on some occasions". On 2 July 2012, Marcus Agius, chairman of Barclays, resigned from the position following the interest rate rigging scandal. Bob Diamond, the chief executive officer of Barclays, resigned on 3 July 2012.  Marcus Agius was to fill his post until a replacement is found. Jerry del Missier, chief operating officer of Barclays, also resigned. Del Missier subsequently admitted that he had instructed his subordinates to submit falsified LIBORs to the British Bankers Association.

By 4 July 2012, the breadth of the scandal was evident and became the topic of analysis on news and financial programs that attempted to explain the importance of the scandal. On 6 July, it was announced that the UK Serious Fraud Office had also opened a criminal investigation into the attempted manipulation of interest rates.

On 4 October 2012, Republican US Senators Chuck Grassley and Mark Kirk announced that they were investigating Treasury Secretary Timothy Geithner for complicity with the rate manipulation scandal. They accused Geithner of knowledge of the rate-fixing, and inaction which contributed to litigation that "threatens to clog our courts with multi-billion dollar class action lawsuits" alleging that the manipulated rates harmed state, municipal and local governments. The senators said that an American-based interest rate index is a better alternative which they would take steps towards creating.

Aftermath
Early estimates are that the rate manipulation scandal cost US states, counties, and local governments at least $6 billion in fraudulent interest payments, above $4 billion that state and local governments have already had to spend to unwind their positions exposed to rate manipulation.

Reforms 
The administration of Libor has itself become a regulated activity overseen by the UK's Financial Conduct Authority. Furthermore, knowingly or deliberately making false or misleading statements in relation to benchmark-setting was made a criminal offence in UK law under the Financial Services Act 2012.

The Danish, Swedish, Canadian, Australian and New Zealand Libor rates have been terminated.

From the end of July 2013, only five currencies and seven maturities will be quoted every day (35 rates), reduced from 150 different Libor rates – 15 maturities for each of ten currencies, making it more likely that the rates submitted are underpinned by real trades.

Since the beginning of July 2013, each individual submission that comes in from the banks is embargoed for three months to reduce the motivation to submit a false rate to portray a flattering picture of creditworthiness.

A new code of conduct, introduced by a new interim oversight committee, builds on this by outlining the systems and controls firms need to have in place around Libor. For example, each bank must now have a named person responsible for Libor, accountable if there is any wrongdoing. The banks must keep records so that they can be audited by the regulators if necessary.

In early 2014, NYSE Euronext took over the administration of Libor from the British Bankers Association. The new administrator was NYSE Euronext Rates Administration Limited, a London-based, UK registered company, regulated by the UK's Financial Conduct Authority.

On 13 November 2013, the Intercontinental Exchange (ICE) Group announced the successful completion of its acquisition of NYSE Euronext. As a result of this acquisition, NYSE Euronext Rate Administration Limited was renamed ICE Benchmark Administration Limited. The appointment of a new administrator is a major step forward in the reform of LIBOR.

The scandal also led to the European Commission proposal of EU-wide benchmark regulation that may affect Libor as well.

LIBOR cessation and alternatives available
Due to multiple factors, including the Libor scandal, concerns about the rates' accuracy, and changes in how banks do business, the decision was made to phase out Libor. Most LIBOR settings will stop being issued or become unrepresentative at the end of 2021, while certain U.S. dollar settings will continue to be provided until the end of June 2023. The Financial Conduct Authority may continue to publish certain synthetic rates after these dates for loans that cannot easily be transitioned.

According to a March 2021 estimate, major banks will spend more than US$100 million transitioning away from LIBOR. From January 2022, the lending rate cannot be used as the reference rate in any new derivatives contracts, loans and credit card offers.

A variety of replacements for LIBOR have been offered. In some cases, banks allow their customers to choose which rate to track.

Alternatives for the USD LIBOR

Alternative Reference Rates Committee 
In 2014 the U.S. Federal Reserve Board and the Federal Reserve Bank of New York announced the creation of the Alternative Rates Reference Committee (ARRC) to assess viable alternatives to the LIBOR.

In 2016 the ARRC released its first report on the possible indices that could serve as a replacement to the LIBOR.

On March 7, 2018 the ARRC announced that the committee had been reconstituted and the following groups were participating.

The ARRC will comprise the following institutions:

 AXA
 Bank of America
 BlackRock
 Citigroup
 CME Group
 Deutsche Bank
 Federal National Mortgage Association
 Federal Home Loan Mortgage Corporation
 GE Capital
 Goldman Sachs
 Government Finance Officers Association
 HSBC
 Intercontinental Exchange
 International Swaps and Derivatives Association
 JP Morgan Chase & Co.
 LCH Clearnet
 MetLife
 Morgan Stanley
 National Association of Corporate Treasurers
 Pacific Investment Management Company
 TD Bank
 The Federal Home Loan Bank of New York
 The Independent Community Bankers of America
 The Loan Syndications and Trading Association
 The Securities Industry and Financial Markets Association
 Wells Fargo
 World Bank Group

In addition, the following agencies will serve as ex officio members of the ARRC:

 Board of Governors of the Federal Reserve System
 Consumer Financial Protection Bureau
 Federal Deposit Insurance Corporation
 Federal Housing Finance Agency
 Federal Reserve Bank of New York
 Office of Financial Research
 Office of the Comptroller of the Currency
 U.S. Commodity Futures Trading Commission
 U.S. Securities and Exchange Commission
 U.S. Treasury Department

Secured Overnight Financing Rate 
In June 2017, the ARRC announced a broad Treasury repo financing rate, SOFR, as its recommended alternative to the USD LIBOR.  In its justification for this choice the ARRC said:

Ameribor 
Ameribor is a benchmark interest rate created by the American Financial Exchange. Ameribor reflects the actual borrowing costs of thousands of small, medium and regional banks across America, but it is also useful for larger banks and financial institutions that do business with these banks, as well as small and middle market companies. Ameribor has traded more than $550 billion since inception in 2015. In addition, the AFX launched Ameribor futures on August 16, 2019.

U.S. Dollar ICE Bank Yield Index 
The U.S. Dollar ICE Bank Yield Index is an index proposed by Intercontinental Exchange Benchmark Administration (IBA) in January 2019 to measure the yields at which investors are willing to lend U.S. dollar funds to large, internationally active banks on a wholesale, unsecured basis over one-month, three-month and six-month periods.  Its usage is intended to be similar to how Libor is currently used.

Alternatives for Yen LIBOR 
Tokyo Overnight Average Rate (TONAR).

See also

Interbank lending market
Libor scandal
Euribor
JIBAR
LIBID
Libor-OIS spread
SHIBOR
SONIA
SOFR
Ted spread
TIBOR
SIBOR
HIBOR
LIBOR market model

Further reading
 Carrick Mollenkamp and Mark Whitehouse, "Study Casts Doubt on Key Rate: WSJ Analysis Suggests Banks May Have Reported Flawed Interest Data for Libor", The Wall Street Journal, Thursday, 29 May 2008, p. 1.
 Donald MacKenzie, "What's in a Number?", London Review of Books, 25 September 2008, pp. 11–12.
 Matt Taibbi: Everything Is Rigged: The Biggest Price-Fixing Scandal Ever, Rolling Stone 25 April 2013

References

External links
1 year LIBOR rate at MoneyCafe.com with historical data and graph
The Wheatley Review of LIBOR: Final Report
 Financial Times: article list

Banking
Interest rates
United States housing bubble
1984 introductions
Reference rates
Swaps (finance)